Lissonoschema macrocolum is a species of beetle of the family Cerambycidae. It was described by Martins & Monné in 1978.

References

Trachyderini
Beetles described in 1978